Michigan Center is an unincorporated community and census-designated place (CDP) in Jackson County in the U.S. state of Michigan. The population was 4,672 at the 2010 census.  The CDP is located within Leoni Township on the eastern border of the city of Jackson.

Michigan Center was platted as "Michigan Centre" in 1837 by Abel Fitch and Paul Ring, although there were settlements in the area from at least 1834. The name was presumably derived from the proximity to the Michigan meridian which divided the state into eastern and western portions for surveying. The community is not close to any sort of geographical center of the state. Fitch became the first postmaster in 1838.

Michigan Center began developing as a mill town on a tributary of the Grand River. There was a station on the Michigan Central Railroad. However, nearby Jackson rapidly outpaced Michigan Center, which has since become a bedroom community to the city.

Geography

Michigan Center is in eastern Jackson County, in the southern part of Leoni Township. The CDP shares a slight western border with the city of Jackson but is otherwise surrounded by Leoni Township on the north, east, and west with a southern boundary with Napoleon Township.

The community is situated primarily around the northern end of Center Lake, formed by a dam on a tributary of the Grand River. Several other nearby lakes on the same tributary form a connected chain of lakes: Round Lake, Price Lake, Moon Lake, Little Dollar Lake, Dollar Lake, Olcott Lake, Little Olcott Lake, Wolf Lake and Little Wolf Lake. Local residents travel between the first several lakes using small boats or personal watercraft.

Demographics

As of the census of 2000, there were 4,641 people, 1,856 households, and 1,308 families residing in the CDP. The racial makeup of the CDP was 97.72% White, 0.34% Black or African American, 0.43% Native American, 0.43% Asian, 0.26% from other races, and 0.82% from two or more races. Hispanic or Latino of any race were 1.53% of the population.

There were 1,856 households, out of which 29.2% had children under the age of 18 living with them, 55.1% were married couples living together, 10.0% had a female householder with no husband present, and 29.5% were non-families. 23.9% of all households were made up of individuals, and 10.1% had someone living alone who was 65 years of age or older.  The average household size was 2.49 and the average family size was 2.94.

In the CDP, the population was spread out, with 23.5% under the age of 18, 6.8% from 18 to 24, 30.3% from 25 to 44, 24.2% from 45 to 64, and 15.2% who were 65 years of age or older.  The median age was 39 years. For every 100 females, there were 101.1 males.  For every 100 females age 18 and over, there were 99.8 males.

The median income for a household in the CDP was $43,056, and the median income for a family was $49,159. Males had a median income of $38,233 versus $29,048 for females. The per capita income for the CDP was $18,701.  About 3.6% of families and 4.9% of the population were below the poverty line, including 4.3% of those under age 18 and 6.8% of those age 65 or over.

Local events 
Michigan Center hosts the annual Carp Carnival at Leoni Township Park in June. The festival features a parade, fishing contest, midway games and rides, chicken barbecue dinners and beer tent.

See also
Michigan Center High School

References

External links
Michigan Center School District
Carp Carnival

Census-designated places in Michigan
Unincorporated communities in Michigan
Unincorporated communities in Jackson County, Michigan
Census-designated places in Jackson County, Michigan
Populated places established in 1837
1837 establishments in Michigan